Philip Steven Gutierrez (born October 13, 1959) is an American lawyer and jurist who serves as the Chief United States district judge of the United States District Court for the Central District of California.

Early life and education
Born in Los Angeles, California, Gutierrez received a Bachelor of Arts degree from the University of Notre Dame in 1981 and a Juris Doctor from UCLA School of Law in 1984. Gutierrez was in private practice in California from 1986 to 1997. He is of Mexican American descent.

Judicial service
Gutierrez was a judge on the Los Angeles County Superior Court, California from 1997 to 2007. He is currently a United States District Judge of the United States District Court for the Central District of California. Gutierrez was nominated by President George W. Bush on January 9, 2007, to a seat vacated by Terry J. Hatter Jr. He was confirmed by the United States Senate on January 30, 2007, and received his commission on February 16, 2007. He became Chief Judge on June 26, 2020, after Cormac J. Carney ended his short tenure as Chief Judge following controversy.

Notable case

Gutierrez heard the trial of Xbox modding defendant Matthew Crippen, a DMCA related case. Gutierrez was noted as providing a scathing rebuke of the prosecution in the early phases of the trial.

See also
List of Hispanic/Latino American jurists

References

External links

1959 births
Living people
21st-century American judges
American people of Mexican descent
California state court judges
Hispanic and Latino American judges
Judges of the United States District Court for the Central District of California
People from Los Angeles
Superior court judges in the United States
United States district court judges appointed by George W. Bush
University of Notre Dame alumni
UCLA School of Law alumni